Huoxiang Zhengqi Shui is a liquid herbal formula used in Traditional Chinese medicine to "induce diaphoresis and clear away summer-heat, to resolve damp and regulate the function of the spleen and stomach". It tastes bitter and pungent. About 5ml to 10ml of this liquid formula is applied twice a day to symptoms such as "colds with accumulation of damp in the interior and summer-heat and dampness marked by headache, dizziness and feeling of heaviness in the head, sensation of stuffiness in the chest, distending pain in the epigastrium and abdomen, vomiting and diarrhea".

Chinese classic herbal formula

See also
 Chinese classic herbal formula
 Bu Zhong Yi Qi Wan

References

Traditional Chinese medicine